Dholi Dam across the Madhumati River forms the Dholi Reservoir in Jhagadia city, Gujarat state, India.

References

Dams in Gujarat
Dams completed in 1995
Reservoirs in India
1995 establishments in Gujarat
20th-century architecture in India